Deadwood (Lakota: Owáyasuta; "To approve or confirm things") is a city that serves as county seat of Lawrence County, South Dakota, United States. It was named by early settlers after the dead trees found in its gulch. The city had its heyday from 1876 to 1879, after gold deposits had been discovered there, leading to the Black Hills Gold Rush. At its height, the city had a population of 25,000, attracting Old West figures such as Wyatt Earp, Calamity Jane, and Wild Bill Hickok (who was killed there).

The population was 1,156 at the 2020 census. The entire town has been designated as a National Historic Landmark District, for its well-preserved Gold Rush-era architecture. Deadwood's proximity to Lead often prompts the two towns being collectively named "Lead-Deadwood".

History

19th century
The settlement of Deadwood began illegally in the 1870s, on land which had been granted to the Lakota people in the 1868 Treaty of Fort Laramie. The treaty had guaranteed ownership of the Black Hills to the Lakota people, who considered this area to be sacred. The settlers' squatting led to numerous land disputes, several of which reached the United States Supreme Court.

Everything changed after Colonel George Armstrong Custer led an expedition into the Black Hills and announced the discovery of gold in 1874, on French Creek near present-day Custer, South Dakota. This announcement was a catalyst for the Black Hills Gold Rush, and miners and entrepreneurs swept into the area. They created the new and lawless town of Deadwood, which quickly reached a population of approximately 5,000. By 1877, about 12,000 people settled in Deadwood,  while other sources put the peak number even at 25,000 in 1876.

In early 1876, frontiersman Charlie Utter and his brother Steve led to Deadwood a wagon train containing what they believed were needed commodities, to bolster business. The town's numerous gamblers and prostitutes staffed several profitable ventures. Madame Mustache and Dirty Em were on the wagon train, and set up shop in what was referred to as Deadwood Gulch. Women were in high demand by the miners, and the business of prostitution proved to have a good market. Madam Dora DuFran eventually became the most profitable brothel owner in Deadwood, closely followed by Madam Mollie Johnson.

Deadwood became known for its lawlessness; murders were common, and justice for murders not always fair and impartial.  The town attained further notoriety when gunman Wild Bill Hickok was killed on August 2, 1876. Both he and Calamity Jane were buried at Mount Moriah Cemetery, as well as other notable figures such as Seth Bullock.

Hickok's murderer, Jack McCall, was prosecuted twice, despite the U.S. Constitution's prohibition against double jeopardy. Because Deadwood was an illegal town in Indian Territory, non-native civil authorities lacked the jurisdiction to prosecute  McCall. McCall's trial was moved to a Dakota Territory court, where he was found guilty of murder and hanged.

Beginning August 12, 1876, a smallpox epidemic swept through. So many people fell ill that tents were erected to quarantine the stricken.

In 1876, General George Crook pursued the Sioux Indians from the Battle of Little Big Horn, on an expedition that ended in Deadwood in early September, known as the Horsemeat March. The same month, businessman Tom Miller opened the Bella Union Saloon.

On April 7, 1877, Al Swearengen, who controlled Deadwood's opium trade, also opened a saloon; his was called the Gem Variety Theater. The saloon burned down and was rebuilt in 1879. When it burned down again in 1899, Swearengen left town.

As the economy changed from gold panning to deep mining, the individual miners went elsewhere or began to work in other fields. Hence Deadwood lost some of its rough and rowdy character, and began to develop into a prosperous town.

The Homestake Mine in nearby Lead was established in October 1877. It operated for more than a century, becoming the longest continuously operating gold mine in the United States. Gold mining operations did not cease until 2002. The mine has been open for visiting by tourists.

On September 26, 1879, a fire devastated Deadwood, destroying more than 300 buildings and consuming the belongings of many inhabitants. Many of the newly impoverished left town to start again elsewhere.

In 1879, Thomas Edison demonstrated the first successful incandescent lamp in New Jersey, and on September 17, 1883, Judge Squire P. Romans took a gamble and founded the "Pilcher Electric Light Company of Deadwood". He ordered an Edison dynamo, wiring, and 15 incandescent lights with globes. After delays, the equipment arrived without the globes. Romans had been advertising an event to show off the new lights and decided to continue with the lighting, which was a success. His company grew. Deadwood had electricity service fewer than four years after Edison commercialized it, less than a year after commercial service was started in Roselle, New Jersey, and around the same time that many larger cities around the country established the service.

In 1888, J.K.P. Miller and his associates founded a narrow-gauge railroad, the Deadwood Central Railroad, to serve their mining interests.  In 1893, Chicago, Burlington and Quincy Railroad purchased the railroad. In 1902, a portion of the railroad between Deadwood and Lead was electrified for operation as an interurban passenger system, which operated until 1924. In 1930, the railroad was abandoned, apart from a portion from Kirk to Fantail Junction, which was converted to standard gauge. In 1984, Burlington Northern Railroad abandoned the remaining section.

Some of the other early town residents and frequent visitors included Martha Bullock, Aaron Dunn, E. B. Farnum, Samuel Fields, A. W. Merrick, Dr. Valentine McGillycuddy, Reverend Henry Weston Smith, Sol Star, and Charlie and Steve Utter.

Chinatown
The gold rush attracted Chinese immigrants to the area; their population peaked at 250. A few engaged in mining; most worked in service enterprises. A Chinese quarter arose on Main Street, as there were no restrictions on foreign property ownership in Dakota Territory, and a relatively high level of tolerance of different peoples existed in the frontier town.  Wong Fee Lee arrived in Deadwood in 1876 and became a leading merchant. He was a community leader among the Chinese Americans until his death in 1921.

The quarter's residents also included African Americans and European Americans. During the 2000s, the state sponsored an archeological dig in the area, to study the history of this community of diverse residents.

20th and 21st centuries
Another major fire in September 1959 nearly destroyed the town again. About  were burned and an evacuation order was issued. Nearly 3,600 volunteer and professional firefighters, including personnel from the Homestake Mine, Ellsworth Air Force Base, and the South Dakota National Guard's 109th Engineer Battalion, worked to contain the fire. The property losses resulted in a major regional economic downturn.

In 1961, the entire town was designated a National Historic Landmark, for its well-preserved collection of late 19th-century frontier architecture. Most of the town's buildings were built before 1900, with only modest subsequent development.  The town's population continued to decline through the 1960s and 1970s. Interstate 90 bypassed Deadwood in 1964, diverting travelers and businesses. On May 21, 1980, a raid by county, state, and federal agents on the town's three remaining brothels—"The White Door", "Pam's Purple Door" and "Dixie's Green Door"—accomplished, as one reporter put it, "what Marshal Hickok never would have done", and the houses of prostitution were padlocked. A fire in December 1987 destroyed the historic Syndicate Building and a neighboring structure.

The fire prompted renewed interest in the area and hopes for redevelopment. Organizers planned the "Deadwood Experiment," in which gambling was tested as a means to stimulate growth in the city center. At the time, gambling was legal only in the state of Nevada and in Atlantic City.

Deadwood was the first small community in the U.S. to seek legal gambling revenue to maintain local historic assets. The state legislature legalized gambling in Deadwood in 1989, which generated significant new revenue and development. The pressure of development since then may have an effect on the historical integrity of the landmark district. Heritage tourism is important for Deadwood and the state.

Geography

Deadwood has been assigned the ZIP code 57732 and the FIPS place code 15700.

Recreation
In the summer, there are numerous trails for hiking, horseback riding, and mountain biking. The northern end of the George S. Mickelson Trail starts in Deadwood and runs south through the Black Hills to Edgemont. Several man made lakes, including Sheridan Lake, provide fishing and swimming. Spearfish Canyon to the north has many places to rock climb. In early June, the Mickelson Trail Marathon and 5K, as well as accompanying races for children, are held.

During the winter, two ski areas operate just a few miles outside of nearby Lead, South Dakota: Terry Peak and Deer Mountain.

The Midnight Star was a casino in Deadwood owned by American film actor Kevin Costner. The casino opened in the spring of 1991, after Costner had directed and starred in the Academy Award-winning film Dances With Wolves (1990), which was filmed mainly in South Dakota. The Midnight Star was a saloon which featured prominently in the previous western Costner had acted in, Silverado (1985), one of his first major roles.  International versions of many of his films' posters lined the walls. The casino closed in August 2017.

Climate
Deadwood's climate varies considerably from the rest of the state and surrounding areas.

Spring is brief, and is characterized by large wet snow storms and periods of rain. Typically the first  temperature will be reached at the beginning of April, the first  near the beginning of May, and the first  around mid-June. Despite the fact that warm afternoons begin occasionally so early, 191.1 mornings each year fall to or below freezing, and even in May 6.8 mornings reach this temperature. Over the year,  is reached on 17.8 mornings per year, and 47.9 afternoons do not top freezing.

The summer season is very warm, although with cool nights: only one afternoon in five years will top , and only 10.7 afternoons equal or exceed . Rainfall tapers off during the summer: August 2000 was one of only two months in the 30-year 1971 to 2000 period to see not even a trace of precipitation. The fall is usually sunny and dry, with increasingly variable temperatures. The last afternoon of over  can be expected on October 5, but the first morning freeze can be expected as early as September 23, and the first snowfall also around October 5.

Since records began in 1948, the hottest temperature has been  most recently on July 10, 1954, and the coldest  during the great freeze of December 1989.

Demographics

2000 census
As of the 2000 census, 1,380 people, 669 households, and 341 families resided in the city.  The population density was 365.4 people per square mile (141.0/km2).  There were 817 housing units at an average density of 216.3 per square mile (83.5/km2).  The racial makeup of the city was 95.87% White, 1.88% Native American, 0.36% Asian, 0.65% from other races, and 1.23% from two or more races. Hispanic or Latino of any race were 2.75% of the population. 29.8% were of German, 9.6% Irish, 9.5% English, 9.5% Norwegian and 8.7% American ancestry.

There were 669 households, out of which 20.5% had children under the age of 18 living with them, 37.7% were married couples living together, 10.9% had a female householder with no husband present, and 48.9% were non-families. 40.1% of all households were made up of individuals, and 14.6% had someone living alone who was 65 years of age or older.  The average household size was 2.01 and the average family size was 2.71.

In the city, the population was spread out, with 19.3% under the age of 18, 8.7% from 18 to 24, 27.3% from 25 to 44, 27.8% from 45 to 64, and 16.8% who were 65 years of age or older.  The median age was 42 years. For every 100 females, there were 93.8 males.  For every 100 females age 18 and over, there were 92.6 males.

As of 2000 the median income for a household in the city was $28,641, and the median income for a family was $37,132. Males had a median income of $28,920 versus $18,807 for females. The per capita income for the city was $17,673.  About 6.9% of families and 10.8% of the population were below the poverty line, including 19.4% of those under age 18 and 8.3% of those age 65 or over.

2010 census
As of the census of 2010, there were 1,270 people, 661 households, and 302 families residing in the city. The racial makeup of the city was 94.9% White, 0.2% African American, 1.8% Native American, 0.5% Asian, 0.6% from other races, and 2.0% from two or more races. Hispanic or Latino of any race were 3.4% of the population.

There were 661 households, of which 17.2% had children under the age of 18 living with them, 33.4% were married couples living together, 7.4% had a female householder with no husband present, 4.8% had a male householder with no wife present, and 54.3% were non-families. 44.6% of all households were made up of individuals, and 12.7% had someone living alone who was 65 years of age or older. The average household size was 1.88 and the average family size was 2.60.

The median age in the city was 48 years. 15% of residents were under the age of 18; 5.9% were between the ages of 18 and 24; 23.3% were from 25 to 44; 37.9% were from 45 to 64; and 17.8% were 65 years of age or older. The gender makeup of the city was 52.5% male and 47.5% female.

Law enforcement

The Deadwood Police Department consists of 23 members (including two reserve patrol officers). The structure of the department consists of a Chief of Police, Lieutenant, one Detective, two Sergeants, 15 Sworn Officers and an office manager. The current Chief of Police is Kenneth J Mertens.

In popular culture

 The Warner Bros. movie musical Calamity Jane (1953), starring Doris Day, was set in Deadwood City.
 Deadwood was the setting of the eponymous television series that ran for three seasons of 12 episodes each, from 2004 to 2006, and its film Deadwood: The Movie (2019).
 A season six episode of Star Trek: The Next Generation, "A Fistful of Datas", focused on a Holodeck program set in Deadwood.

Notable people

Gold rush period (born before 1870)

 Granville G. Bennett (1833–1910), lawyer and politician
 Martha Bullock (1851-1939), frontierswoman, Seth Bullock's wife
 Seth Bullock (1849–1919), sheriff, entrepreneur 
 Calamity Jane (Martha Jane Canary) (1852–1903), frontierswoman
 William H. Clagett (1838–1901), lawyer and politician
 Richard Clarke (1845–1930), frontiersman
General George Crook (1828–1890), in 1876, pursued the Sioux Indians from the Battle of Little Big Horn, on an expedition that ended in Deadwood in early September, known as the Horsemeat March; several locations associated with Deadwood are Crook's namesakes
 Indiana Sopris Cushman (1839–1925), pioneer teacher in Colorado
 Charles Henry Dietrich (1853–1924), 11th Governor of Nebraska
Dirty Em, a madam who owned a brothel in Deadwood Gulch
 Dora DuFran (1868–1934), brothel owner in Deadwood
 Wyatt Earp (1848–1929),  American investor and law enforcement officer
 E. B. Farnum (1826–1878), pioneer
 Samuel Fields supposed Civil War figure and prospector
 Arthur De Wint Foote (1849–1933), engineer
 Mary Hallock Foote (1847–1938), author and illustrator
 George Hearst U.S. Senator from California
 Wild Bill Hickok (1837–1876), gambler and gunslinger
 Mollie Johnson (d. after 1883), madam in Deadwood
 Freeman Knowles (1846–1910), politician
 Joseph Ladue (1855–1901), prospector, businessman, and founder of Dawson City, Yukon
 Jack Langrishe (1825–1895), actor
 Wong Fee Lee (died 1921), a leading Deadwood merchant and a community leader among the Chinese Americans until his death
 Kitty Leroy (1850–1878), gambler, trick shooter, and frontierswoman
 H. R. Locke (1856–1927), photographer
 Jack McCall (1852/1853 – March 1, 1877), also known as "Crooked Nose" or "Broken Nose Jack", gambler who murdered "Wild Bill" Hickok
 Valentine McGillycuddy, surgeon
 A. W. Merrick, journalist who published the first newspaper in Deadwood
Tom Miller opened the Bella Union Saloon, in September 1876
 Madame Moustache (1834–1879), gambler
 K. P. Miller and his associates founded a narrow-gauge railroad, the Deadwood Central Railroad, in 1888, to serve their mining interests, and in 1893, sold it to Chicago, Burlington and Quincy Railroad. 
 Judge Squire P. Romans, on September 17, 1883, founded the Pilcher Electric Light Company of Deadwood; consequently, Deadwood had electricity service fewer than four years after Edison invented it, less than a year after commercial service was started in Roselle, New Jersey, and around the same time that many larger cities around the country established the service.
 Reverend Henry Weston Smith (1827–1876), early frontiersman and preacher
 Sol Star, entrepreneur, politician
 William Randolph Steele (1842–1901), former resident, mayor of Deadwood, lawyer, soldier, and politician
 Al Swearengen (1845–1904), entertainment entrepreneur
 Charlie Utter (c. 1838 – aft. 1912), frontiersman who, with his brother Steve, led a wagon train to and set up shop in Deadwood, where they ran an express delivery service

Later

 Jerry Bryant (died 2015), historian
 Charles Badger Clark (1883–1957), poet
 Mary McLaughlin Craig (1889–1964), architect
 Rowland Crawford (1902–1973), architect
 Gary Mule Deer (b. 1939), comedian and country musician
 Amy Hill (b. 1953), Japanese-Finnish-American actress
 Carole Hillard (1936–2007), Lieutenant Governor of South Dakota 1995–2003
 Ward Lambert (1888–1958), college basketball coach
 William H. Parker (1905–1966), former police chief of Los Angeles
 Dorothy Provine (1935–2010), actress and dancer
 Craig Puki, former linebacker for the San Francisco 49ers and St. Louis Cardinals
 Angelo Rizzuto (1906–1967), photographer
 Bill Russell (b. 1949), lyricist
 Bob Schloredt (1939–2019), former college football player for the Washington Huskies
 Jim Scott (1888–1957), played with the Chicago White Sox
 Jeff Steitzer (b. 1951), voice actor 
 Chuck Turbiville (1943-2018), mayor of Deadwood and member of the South Dakota House of Representatives 
 Philip S. Van Cise (1884–1969), Colorado district attorney
 Alfred L. Werker (1896–1975), film director
 Cris Williamson (b. 1947), singer/musician

See also
 List of cities in South Dakota

References

External links

 
 Deadwood Chamber of Commerce
 Deadwood Historic Preservation Commission
 Deadwood Digital Media Archive (creative commons-licensed photos, laser scans, panoramas), data from a DHPC/CyArk partnership
 Adams House and Museum 
 Enjoy Deadwood South Dakota
 

 
American folklore
American frontier
Black Hills
Cities in South Dakota
County seats in South Dakota
Cities in Lawrence County, South Dakota
National Historic Landmarks in South Dakota
Historic districts on the National Register of Historic Places in South Dakota
National Register of Historic Places in Lawrence County, South Dakota